Bryan Alexander Dominguez Solarte (born March 7, 1991) is an American soccer player currently without a club.

Early life and education 
Dominguez was born in Atlanta, Georgia, but moved to Cali, Colombia, around the age of 1 and grew up there.  His family returned to the Atlanta-area after around 10 years.  Dominguez was offered a place at the US National Residency Program in Bradenton, Florida in 2006.  He attended the Edison Academic Center and was named on back-to-back NSCAA/adidas Boys Youth All-America Teams in 2006 and 2007.  He was also named as a Parade magazine All-American.

Dominguez enrolled at the University of California, Santa Barbara and played college soccer as a student-athlete for the UC Santa Barbara Gauchos men's soccer team.  In his single season on campus, he appeared in 13 games and scored 1 goal with 5 assists.

Club career 
Dominguez, who left school early to pursue a professional career, signed a contract with Traffic Sports USA in 2009.  He would eventually be placed with Miami FC of the USSF Division 2 Professional League.  He made his professional debut on April 10, 2010 in a game against the Rochester Rhinos.  He appeared in 15 games for the club, scoring 0 goals and assisting once.

Dominguez joined América de Cali of the Colombian Categoría Primera B in 2011 and was promoted from the youth and reserve set up in January 2012.

Dominguez later joined German Hessenliga side 1. FCA Darmstadt in 2012.  He appeared in 6 Hessenliga matches for the club before leaving.

International career 
Dominguez was a member of the United States U-14 and U-16 boys national teams.  He would play for the United States U-17 men's national soccer team in 2007, and scored one goal in his four appearances with the team at the FIFA U-17 World Cup in South Korea.  He would later feature for the United States U-20 men's national soccer team.

References

External links 
 
 US Soccer player profile
 Miami FC player profile
 USSF Division 2 player profile
 UC Santa Barbara player profile

1991 births
Living people
American soccer players
Soccer players from Atlanta
Association football midfielders
UC Santa Barbara Gauchos men's soccer players
América de Cali footballers
Expatriate footballers in Colombia
Miami FC (2006) players
USSF Division 2 Professional League players
United States men's youth international soccer players